My Beloved is a 2012 Philippine television drama romance fantasy series broadcast by GMA Network. Directed by Dominic Zapata and Lore Reyes, it stars Dingdong Dantes and Marian Rivera. It premiered on February 13, 2012 on the network's Telebabad line up replacing Survivor Philippines: Celebrity Doubles Showdown. The series concluded on June 8, 2012 with a total of 83 episodes. It was replaced by One True Love in its timeslot.

Production
Principal photography commenced on October 4, 2011 with Dingdong Dantes and Rhian Ramos in the lead roles. Ramos later left the role. On December 16, Marian Rivera was cast as Ramos' replacement.

Cast and characters

Lead cast
 Dingdong Dantes as Benjamin "Benjie" Castor / Arlan
 Marian Rivera as Sharina Quijano-Castor

Supporting cast
 Katrina Halili as Emilia "Emmie" Montecastro
 Mikael Daez as Nelson De Guia
 Jennica Garcia as Monica Quijano
 Carl Guevara as Junic Tablante
 Louise delos Reyes as Grace Velasco
 Alden Richards as Rico Castor
 Paolo Contis as Geronimo "Gimo" Magtoto
 Nova Villa as Inggay Castor
 Chanda Romero as Elsa Quijano
 Saab Magalona as Ginella Quijano
 Ynna Asistio as Lyzette
 Gianna Cutler as Pepay
 Reika Suzuki as Sunshine

Recurring cast
 Marky Lopez as Tikyo
 Djanin Cruz as Lucy
 Andrea Torres as Dessa
 James Ronald Obeso as Michael
 Rodfil Obeso as Jackson
 Frank Magalona as Ronald
 John Hall as Joryl
 Fabio Ide as Rowan
 Jay Gonzaga as Mikal

Guest cast
 John Arcilla as Romeo Quijano
 Sharmaine Arnaiz as Perla Quijano-Castor
 Cris Villanueva as Crisanto Castor
 Janine Gutierrez as Joanne Ledesma
 Nathalie Hart as Trixie Montemayor
 Veyda Inoval as Sunshine Castor / Sunshine Magtoto

Ratings
According to AGB Nielsen Philippines' Mega Manila household television ratings, the pilot episode of My Beloved earned a 30.3% rating. While the final episode scored a 26.1% rating.

Accolades

References

External links
 

2012 Philippine television series debuts
2012 Philippine television series endings
Filipino-language television shows
GMA Network drama series
Philippine romance television series
Television shows set in the Philippines